Statistics of Turkish First Football League in season 1988/1989.

Overview
It was contested by 19 teams, and Fenerbahçe S.K. won the championship. 

On 20 January 1989, while traveling to Malatya to face Malatyaspor, Samsunspor were involved in a  bus accident that killed three of their players and left seven others seriously injured. In addition, two coaches, manager Nuri Asan, and the team's bus driver were also killed in the accident. 

Due to the tragedy, Samsunpor were left unable to field a team for their remaining 18 matches, which were scratched and awarded 3-0 to Samsunspor's opponents, while Samsunspor were reprieved from relegation at the end of the season.

League table

Results

References
Turkey - List of final tables (RSSSF)

Süper Lig seasons
1988–89 in Turkish football
Turkey